Guram Mchedlidze (born 12 August 1972) is a Georgian wrestler. He competed in the men's freestyle 76 kg at the 2000 Summer Olympics.

References

External links
 

1972 births
Living people
Male sport wrestlers from Georgia (country)
Olympic wrestlers of Georgia (country)
Wrestlers at the 2000 Summer Olympics
People from Ochamchira District